Peridot (stylized in all caps) is a Japanese manga series written and illustrated by Hiyoko Kobayashi. It was serialized in Kodansha's seinen manga magazine Young Magazine Uppers from 1999 to 2001, with its chapters collected in six tankōbon volumes.

Publication
Kodansha collected its chapters in six tankōbon volumes, released from November 9, 1999, to December 26, 2001. A one-shot chapter was published in Weekly Young Magazine on June 14, 2010, for the celebration of the magazine's 30th anniversary.

See also
Oku-sama wa Joshi Kōsei, another manga series by the same author
Hantsu × Trash, another manga series by the same author

References

Further reading

External links
 

Action anime and manga
Kodansha manga
Seinen manga